Angria or Angaria is a historical region in the present-day German states of Lower Saxony and North Rhine-Westphalia. The chronicler Widukind of Corvey in his Res gestae saxonicae sive annalium libri tres denoted it as the central region of the medieval Duchy of Saxony lying along the middle reaches of the Weser river between Westphalia and Eastphalia. Its name was derived from the Germanic Angrivarii tribe which had joined the Saxon tribal confederation, and it was centered on the town of Minden, see of a bishopric since 803.

The Angrivarii lands were conquered by Charlemagne during the Saxon Wars; according to the Royal Frankish Annals, the Angrian commanders concluded a separate peace agreement with the Carolingian Empire near Bückeburg in 775.

In 1180, the Emperor Frederick I deposed the duke of Saxony, Henry the Lion, and divided the duchy into two parts through the so-called Gelnhausen Charter. The Duchy of Westphalia was granted to the Archbishopric of Cologne, while Angria was given to Bernhard of Anhalt, who used the Saxon ducal title. The name Angria thereafter became obsolete. In the 13th century, the central area on the Weser became the nucleus of the County of Hoya, which in 1582 was inherited by the House of Brunswick-Lüneburg.

See also
Enger

Geography of Lower Saxony
Geography of North Rhine-Westphalia
Duchy of Saxony